The Colony-class frigates were a series of 21 frigates constructed in the United States by Walsh-Kaiser of Providence, Rhode Island for transfer under Lend-Lease to the Royal Navy in 1944. They were given the names of relatively minor colonies as names of large colonies had been used for the s.

The ships were built as United States Navy  patrol frigates, a design that was an adaptation of the Royal Navy  design built in UK, Canada and Australia, with modifications made mainly to use materials and parts more readily available in the United States. For example, American  guns were used as the main surface armament in the Tacoma- and Colony-class frigates instead of the British QF  Mk XIX guns of the River-class. They were mass-produced to mercantile standards to enable their speedy construction in shipyards that did not normally build warships. They were built more quickly than British shipyards could build the Rivers, but the quicker build required more man-hours and sterling cost was about twice that of a River. Upon transfer to the Royal Navy, each ship underwent modifications to bring her in line with Royal Navy requirements.

Uniquely among the Colony-class frigates, and indeed among all World War II frigates, HMS Caicos was fitted and used as an aircraft detection frigate, stationed in the North Sea to detect V-1 flying bombs targeted against Great Britain. The other 20 ships served on patrol and convoy escort duties during the latter part of World War II. The ships are mentioned in HM Frigate by Nicholas Monsarrat, a very slim volume published under wartime censorship rules.

Post-war, the Royal Navy returned one of the ships to the U.S. Navy in 1945 and the rest during 1946. None saw U.S. Navy service. Two of the ships were sold into mercantile service in Egypt, surviving until 1956, and Caicos was sold to Argentina in 1947 and served in the Argentine Navy until 1969. The United States scrapped the rest between 1947 and 1949, as they were considered inferior to destroyer escorts, which the U.S. Navy had in ample numbers, in every aspect except range.

List of ships
With date returned to the United States (unless otherwise stated). Almost all were scrapped by 1946 or 1947, unless stated.
  : 31 May 1946; scrapped 1949
  : 2 May 1946
  : 31 May 1946
  : 11 June 1946
  : 11 June 1946
  : 12 December 1945; sold to Argentina as Santísima Trinidad, later Comodoro Augusto Lasserre, sold and scrapped 1971
  : 23 April 1946
  : 23 April 1946
 , (ex-HMS Gold Coast): 18 May 1948; scrapped 1957
  : 11 June 1946
  : 15 April 1946
  : 13 May 1946; sold to Egypt and sank in Gulf of Suez 1953
 , (ex-HMS Sierra Leone): 22 May 1946
  : 11 June 1946
  : 22 May 1946
  : June 1946
  : 22 May 1946
  : 8 April 1946
 , (ex-HMS Hong Kong): 13 May 1946; sold to Egypt and scuttled as a blockship in the Suez Canal, 1956
  : 22 May 1946
  : 31 May 1946

Gallery

See also
 
 List of ships of World War II
 List of ship classes of World War II

Notes

References

External links

 U-boat.net
 Record of World War II Shipbuilding by Walsh-Kaiser Company

 
Frigate classes
Ship classes of the Royal Navy